Jim Price may refer to:

Jim Price (tight end) (born 1966), former NFL tight end
Jim Price (linebacker) (born 1940), former American football linebacker
Jim Price (catcher) (born 1941), former Detroit Tigers catcher and current sportscaster
Jim Price (baseball manager) (1847–1925), manager of the New York Gothams
Jim Price (basketball) (born 1949), former NBA player, coach of ABA Tampa Bay Strong Dogs
Jim Price (musician) (born 1945), American record producer and session musician

See also 
James Price (disambiguation)